Olta Boka (born 13 September 1991) is an Albanian singer, known for representing Albania in the Eurovision Song Contest 2008 with the song "Zemrën e lamë peng", after winning Festivali i Këngës 46.

Career
Olta Boka was born in the capital Tirana. She started singing at a very young age. She has participated in the talent shows: "Gjeniu i vogël" where she won the Best Performer award, and also in "Ethet e së premtes mbrëma" (Albanian version of Idols).

She rose to fame after winning Festivali i Këngës in 2007, giving her the right to represent Albania in Eurovision Song Contest the next year. She competed in the second semi-final on May 22, and won a place in the final on May 24, where she finished 17th out of 25 entrants with 55 points. She is the youngest singer to represent a country in the Eurovision Song Contest since the year 2004, with Cyprus' representative who was 16 years old.

She has won several awards in the major musical event Kënga Magjike. She has also won the "Top Albania Radio Award" in Top Fest 11. In 2013, Boka played the role of Esmeralda in the Albanian version of Notre Dame de Paris musical. A year later, she participated in TV Klan's dancing competition "Dance With Me" and won four prizes, alongside actor Devis Muka.

Discography
 2001: Të dy prindërit i dua
 2007: Zemrën e lamë peng
 2009: S'duhet të dua
 2009: Jepu me zemër
 2010: Mbete një brengë
 2011: Anna
 2013: E fundit tango
 2014: Ti më ke mua (ft. Erik Lloshi)
 2014: Parfumi i tij
 2016: Rri edhe pak
 2017: Atij/asaj (ft. Stiv Boka)

Awards 

Kënga Magjike

|-
||2009
||"Jepu me zemër"
|AMC Prize
|
|-
||2010
||"Mbete një brengë"
|Best Ballad
|
|-
||2011
||"Anna"
|AMC Prize
|
|-
||2013
||"E fundit tango"
|Best Performance
|
|}

Top Fest

|-
||2014
||"Ti më ke mua" (ft. Erik Lloshi)
|Top Albania Radio Award
|
|}

References

21st-century Albanian women singers
Eurovision Song Contest entrants for Albania
Eurovision Song Contest entrants of 2008
Musicians from Tirana
1991 births
Living people
Festivali i Këngës winners
Albanian pop musicians